Joe and Ethel Turp Call on the President is a 1939 American comedy film directed by Robert B. Sinclair and written by Melville Baker. The film stars Ann Sothern, Lewis Stone, Walter Brennan, William Gargan, Marsha Hunt and Tom Neal. It was released on December 1, 1939 by Metro-Goldwyn-Mayer.

Plot
Brooklynites Ethel and Joe Turp visit Washington, D.C. to petition the president to pardon their mailman Jim, who accidentally destroyed a registered letter.

Cast 
Ann Sothern as Ethel Turp
Lewis Stone as the President
Walter Brennan as Jim
William Gargan as Joe Turp
Marsha Hunt as Kitty Crusper
Tom Neal as Johnny Crusper
 James Bush as Henry Crusper
Don Costello as Fred
Muriel Hutchison as Francine La Vaughn 
Jack Norton as Parker
Aldrich Bowker as Mike O'Brien
Frederick Burton as Bishop Bannon
Al Shean as Father Reicher
Robert Emmett O'Connor as Pat Donegan
Cliff Clark as Garage Owner
Russell Hicks as Mr. Graves
Paul Everton as Senator
Charles Trowbridge as Cabinet Member

References

External links 
 

1939 films
American comedy films
1939 comedy films
Metro-Goldwyn-Mayer films
American black-and-white films
Films directed by Robert B. Sinclair
Films scored by Edward Ward (composer)
1930s English-language films
1930s American films